Plum Orchard Lake Wildlife Management Area, is located near Pax, West Virginia in Fayette county.

Access to Plum Orchard Lake WMA is from the Mossy or Pax exits of I-77, then following County Route 23 (Paint Creek Road) to County Route 23/1 (Plum Orchard Lake Road.)

Hunting and Fishing

Hunting opportunities in Plum Orchard Lake WMA include deer,  raccoon, squirrel, turkey and waterfowl.

Fishing opportunities in  Plum Orchard Lake include largemouth bass, channel catfish,  crappie, bluegill, sunfish, crappie.

Four boat ramps are available at Plum Orchard Lake.  Forty-two (42) rustic camping sites for tents or trailers are available in the WMA.

See also

Animal conservation
Fishing
Hunting
List of West Virginia wildlife management areas

References

External links
West Virginia DNR District 4 Wildlife Management Areas
West Virginia Hunting Regulations
West Virginia Fishing Regulations
WVDNR map of Plum Orchard Lake Wildlife Management Area

Campgrounds in West Virginia
Protected areas of Barbour County, West Virginia
Protected areas of Taylor County, West Virginia
Wildlife management areas of West Virginia
Protected areas established in 1960
1960 establishments in West Virginia